The North Carolina Railroad  is a  state-owned rail corridor extending from Morehead City, North Carolina to Charlotte, North Carolina. The railroad carries over seventy freight trains offered by the Norfolk Southern Railway and eight passenger trains (Amtrak's Carolinian and Piedmont) daily. It is managed by the North Carolina Railroad Company and operated by Norfolk Southern.

History
In 1848 the North Carolina legislature authorized a railroad that would connect the eastern part of the state with the Piedmont. North Carolina Senate President Calvin Graves cast the deciding vote, ensuring the railroad would be built, but ending his political career because it would not pass through his district. The North Carolina Railroad was incorporated January 27, 1849 by special act of the North Carolina legislature.

In 1851 Senator Graves was given the honor of lifting the first shovel of dirt as construction of the railroad began in Greensboro, North Carolina. Three years later, in 1854, the railroad's first president, businessman John Motley Morehead, dubbed the rail line "the tree of life" for the state.

Approximately 130 miles of the  gauge railroad between Goldsboro, North Carolina and Greensboro was opened for operation on December 13, 1855. Approximately 94 miles of the railroad between Greensboro and Charlotte, North Carolina was opened for operation on January 30, 1856. In early 1856 the first train traveled along the entire route, from Goldsboro to Charlotte.

In 1858 the Atlantic and North Carolina Railroad was completed, opening  of rail between Goldsboro and Shepard's Point, now Morehead City, North Carolina.  Efforts to consolidate the Atlantic and North Carolina with the NCRR were initiated in 1866, but it would take until 1989 to complete the merger and consolidate the railroads from Morehead City to Charlotte.

The North Carolina Railroad was leased to the Richmond and Danville Railroad Company and its receiver from September 11, 1871 to June 30, 1894.

From July 1, 1894, the North Carolina Railroad was leased to the R&D's successor, Southern Railway Company for a 99-year period. Southern merged with Norfolk & Western Railway to form Norfolk Southern, which inherited the NCRR lease. Norfolk Southern retained control of the railroad until 1999, when NCRR and Norfolk Southern reached an exclusive Trackage Rights Agreement for Norfolk Southern’s continuing freight and maintenance operations on the NCRR line for 15 years, renewable for an additional 30 years.

One year prior to the establishment of this new lease with Norfolk Southern, in 1998, the State of North Carolina agreed to buy out the remaining 25% private shares of NCRR stock, making it a privately run company with the voting stock fully owned by the state.

In 2000, the North Carolina legislature established by statute that North Carolina Railroad Company dividends paid to the State were required to be used by the North Carolina Department of Transportation for improvements to the NCRR line.  At that time, NCRR was a Real Estate Investment Trust.  In 2013, the legislature rewrote this statute to provide that the dividends of the North Carolina Railroad Company received by the NCDOT may be used by NCDOT for the purposes set forth in the statute.

NCRR Today
Recently, North Carolina Railroad Company added three new passing sidings over eight miles and centralized traffic control between Raleigh and Selma (30 miles) in order to increase capacity for both freight and passenger trains.  The Company is also replacing several other bridges along the corridor to improve safety, efficiency, and speed. Other improvements made by the NCRR since 2001 include rail and bridge upgrades between Raleigh and Morehead City, NC at a cost in excess of $60 million. In 2010, the Company completed commuter rail investment and ridership studies for the segments between Goldsboro and Greensboro, through Raleigh.

Beginning in 2008, the North Carolina Railroad Company is working with the North Carolina Department of Transportation and Norfolk Southern to improve crossing safety on the eastern portion of the line by upgrading gates and crossing signals. The Company is also working with these parties to add or replace double track between Charlotte and Raleigh in an initiative to extend higher speed passenger rail south to Charlotte from Washington via Richmond, Virginia.

The North Carolina Railroad was instrumental in encouraging the economic development of North Carolina in the 19th century, helping to define new markets, new industries, and new cities and today NCRR continues to contribute to the state’s economy.  The North Carolina Railroad carries over one million carloads of freight each year and about 300,000 passengers.  Based on a 2007 study by the Research Triangle Institute, the North Carolina Railroad saves North Carolina industries $198 million in transportation costs annually, and the total impact on North Carolina economic output is $338 million annually.  In 2005, in counties bordering NCRR tracks, industries using rail freight services accounted for $143 billion in output, more than 24% of North Carolina’s total economy.  NCRR freight transportation also has environmental benefits, conveying $65.7 million in external benefits.

See also

North Carolina Department of Transportation
Amtrak
Norfolk Southern Railway

Footnotes

References
Interstate Commerce Commission. Southern Ry. Co., Volume 37, Interstate Commerce Commission Valuation Reports, November 6, 1931, p. 437. Washington: United States Government Printing Office, 1932. .
NCRR Website
Research Triangle Institute Study, September 2014

4 ft 8 in gauge railways in the United States
North Carolina railroads
Transportation in North Carolina
Predecessors of the Southern Railway (U.S.)
Railway companies established in 1849
Non-operating common carrier freight railroads in the United States
Norfolk Southern Railway lines
1849 establishments in North Carolina